Dandepalle is a mandal in Mancherial district in the state of Telangana in India.

Administrative divisions
There are 30 Villages in the Mandal.

References 

Mandals in Mancherial district